Jason Stephens (born 1975) is a film producer based in Chicago. He is the founder and former executive director of the not-for-profit film production company Split Pillow. Stephens was named "Chicagoan of the Year" in 2004 by the Chicago Tribune for "providing a national platform for more local talent than anyone else." He currently teaches in the Business and Entrepreneurship Department at Columbia College, Chicago and is Chairman of the Board of Directors for Kartemquin Films.

References 

1975 births
Living people
Film producers from Illinois
Columbia College Chicago faculty
Businesspeople from Chicago